From January 2017 through 2021, Donald Trump was the 45th President of the United States; he is the only American president to have no political or military service prior to his presidency, and is generally regarded by historians as one of the worst presidents in U.S. history. Trump has officially run as a candidate for president four times, in 2000, 2016, 2020, and 2024; he also "unofficially" campaigned in 2012 and mulled a run in 2004. He won the 2016 general election through the Electoral College despite losing the popular vote to Democratic nominee Hillary Clinton by 2.8 million votes, the greatest losing margin in the popular vote of any U.S. president; he was thereby elected the 45th president of the United States on November 8, 2016, and inaugurated on January 20, 2017. He unsuccessfully sought reelection in the 2020 United States presidential election, losing by 7 million votes to Democratic nominee Joe Biden. Trump is the only US president to have been impeached twice, or to be impeached for incitement of insurrection against the United States (for his role in the failed 2021 United States Capitol attack after his defeat in the 2020 election). One representative survey of presidential experts rated Trump last in overall ability, background, integrity, intelligence, and executive appointments, and next to last in party leadership, relationship to congress, and ability to compromise. Among the American public, Trump's average 41 percent approval rating was the lowest of any president since Gallup began polling, and he left office with a 34 percent approval rating and 62 percent disapproval rating in his final polls.

Trump's overt political activity started with his publicly suggesting a run for president in the late 1980s. Ever since, Trump maintained a steady interest in politics, though he was not always considered a serious candidate. Trump has spoken at the Conservative Political Action Conference (CPAC) multiple times, with his first appearance in 2012; Trump gained increasing political notoriety with the public for his promotion of the racist Birtherism conspiracy theory during this period, which has been described as having had "essentially launched his current political career." From 2013 to 2015, Trump continued to make political headlines but was still polling low and not taken seriously by analysts. Trump subsequently became the 2016 Republican nominee for president of the United States after beating sixteen other candidates during a controversial campaign that drew praise and support from foreign dictatorships, domestic white nationalists, and the global far right. The New Yorker said a key cause for Trump's victory in the GOP primary was that "Despite having demonstrated political cunning in the course of dispatching his sixteen rivals, he has managed to convince many Republican voters that he isn’t a politician at all." He became president as a result of winning the 2016 presidential election's electoral college, making him the fifth person to be elected president but lose the popular vote. U.S. Intelligence officials later determined that the Government of the Russian Federation  had illegally intervened in the election to aid Trump's victory. Trump's presidency saw large levels of cabinet and staff turnover, to an extent unprecedented in modern American history. He saw numerous allegations of misconduct that resulted in investigations by Congress and Special Council as well as two impeachments. Trump was president at the time of the outbreak of the Covid-19 pandemic until his 2020 electoral defeat. He is generally considered by analysts to have greatly bungled the handling of the pandemic, helping lead to a deep and ongoing global economic recession, and his landslide electoral defeat.

On June 18, 2019, Trump announced that he would seek re-election in the 2020 presidential election. The election on November 3 was not called for either candidate for several days; on November 7, the Associated Press – along with major TV networks including CNN, ABC News, CBS News, NBC News, and Fox News – called the race for Joe Biden. Trump refused to concede, despite the final election results not being close, and the administration did not begin cooperating with president-elect Biden's transition team until November 23. With one week remaining in his presidency, Trump was impeached by the House of Representatives for incitement of insurrection for his actions during the January 6 coup and attack on the United States Capitol, but was acquitted in the Republican-controlled Senate because the 57–43 vote in favor of convicting him fell short of the 2/3 supermajority (67 out of 100 senators) required for conviction. Trump continues to push the false idea that he is still the true president of the United States, which has led to ongoing controversy within the Republican party.

There are currently four major ongoing criminal investigations into Trump’s criminal activity while in office.
 The chairman of Trump’s presidential campaign, Paul Manafort, his chief political strategist, Steve Bannon, and his campaign counsel, Michael Cohen, have all been since sentenced to prison for various criminal acts connected to Trump’s campaign and presidency.
 At least 8 other members of Trump’s campaign have been charged with the commission of federal crimes.

Political activities up to 2015 

Trump's political party affiliation has changed numerous times. He registered as a Republican in Manhattan in 1987, switched to the Reform Party in 1999, the Democratic Party in 2001, and back to the Republican Party in 2009.

Trump first floated the idea of running for president in 1987, placing full-page advertisements in three major newspapers, proclaiming "America should stop paying to defend countries that can afford to defend themselves." The advertisements also advocated for "reducing the budget deficit, working for peace in Central America, and speeding up nuclear disarmament negotiations with the Soviet Union". DCCC chair Rep. Beryl Anthony Jr. told The New York Times that "the message Trump has been preaching is a Democratic message." Asked whether rumors of a presidential candidacy were true, Trump denied being a candidate, but said, "I believe that if I did run for President, I'd win." In 1988, he approached Lee Atwater asking to be put into consideration as Republican nominee George H. W. Bush's running mate. Bush found the request "strange and unbelievable." According to a Gallup poll in December 1988, Trump was the tenth most admired man in America.

2000 presidential campaign 

In 1999, Trump formed an exploratory committee to seek the nomination of the Reform Party for the 2000 presidential election. A July 1999 poll matching him against likely Republican nominee George W. Bush and likely Democratic nominee Al Gore showed Trump with seven percent support. Trump eventually dropped out of the race, but still went on to win the Reform Party primaries in California and Michigan. After his run, he left the party due to the involvement of David Duke, Pat Buchanan, and Lenora Fulani. He also considered running for president in 2004. In 2008, after endorsing Democrat Hillary Clinton in the primary, he endorsed Republican John McCain for president in the general election.

2012 presidential speculation 

Trump publicly speculated about running for president in the 2012 election, and made his first speaking appearance at the Conservative Political Action Conference (CPAC) in February 2011. The speech is credited for helping kick-start his political career within the Republican Party.
 
On May 16, 2011, Trump announced he would not run for president in the 2012 election, putting an end to what he described as "unofficially campaigning". In February 2012, Trump endorsed Mitt Romney for president.
 
Trump's presidential ambitions were generally not taken seriously at the time. Trump's moves were interpreted by some media as possible promotional tools for his reality show The Apprentice. Before the 2016 election, The New York Times speculated that Trump "accelerated his ferocious efforts to gain stature within the political world" after Obama lampooned him at the White House Correspondents' Association Dinner in April 2011.
 
In 2011, according to Evan Jones, the headmaster of the New York Military Academy at the time, the then-superintendent Jeffrey Coverdale had demanded Trump's academic records, to hand them over to "prominent, wealthy alumni of the school who were Mr. Trump's friends" at their request. Coverdale said he had refused to hand over Trump's records to trustees of the school, and instead sealed Trump's records on campus. Jones said: "It was the only time in my education career that I ever heard of someone's record being removed," while Coverdale further said: "It's the only time I ever moved an alumnus's records." The incident reportedly happened days after Trump demanded President Barack Obama's academic records.

2013–2015 

In 2013, Trump spoke at CPAC again; he railed against illegal immigration, bemoaned Obama's "unprecedented media protection", advised against harming Medicare, Medicaid, and Social Security, and suggested that the government "take" Iraq's oil and use the proceeds to pay a million dollars each to families of dead soldiers. He spent over $1 million that year to research a possible 2016 candidacy.

In October 2013, New York Republicans circulated a memo suggesting Trump should run for governor of the state in 2014 against Andrew Cuomo. Trump responded that while New York had problems and its taxes were too high, he was not interested in the governorship. A February 2014 Quinnipiac poll had shown Trump losing to the more popular Cuomo by 37 points in a hypothetical election.

2016 presidential campaign

Republican primaries 

On June 16, 2015, Trump announced his candidacy for President of the United States at Trump Tower in Manhattan. In the speech, Trump discussed illegal immigration, offshoring of American jobs, the U.S. national debt, and Islamic terrorism, which all remained large priorities during the campaign. He also announced his campaign slogan: "Make America Great Again". Trump said his wealth would make him immune to pressure from campaign donors. He declared that he was funding his own campaign, but according to The Atlantic, "Trump's claims of self-funding have always been dubious at best and actively misleading at worst." Much of Trump's campaign centered on his promise that, if elected president, he would build a Border wall on the United States-Mexico Border, a campaign promise which he never fulfilled.

In the primaries, Trump was one of seventeen candidates for the 2016 Republican nomination. This was, at the time, the largest presidential field in American history. Trump's campaign was initially not taken seriously by political analysts, but he quickly rose to the top of opinion polls. The New Yorker attributed Trump's clinching of the Republican nomination largely to the party base's "general disgust with professional politicians" and Trump's ability to distinguish himself from traditional Republican politicians.

On Super Tuesday, Trump received the most votes, and he remained the front-runner throughout the primaries. By March 2016, Trump was poised to win the Republican nomination. After a landslide win in Indiana on May 3, 2016which prompted the remaining candidates Ted Cruz and John Kasich to suspend their presidential campaignsRNC chairman Reince Priebus declared Trump the presumptive Republican nominee.

General election campaign 

After becoming the presumptive Republican nominee, Trump shifted his focus to the general election. Trump began campaigning against Hillary Clinton, who became the presumptive Democratic nominee on June 6, 2016.

Clinton had established a significant lead over Trump in national polls throughout most of 2016. In early July, Clinton's lead narrowed in national polling averages following the FBI's re-opening of its investigation into her ongoing email controversy.

On July 15, 2016, Trump announced his selection of Indiana governor Mike Pence as his running mate. Four days later, the two were officially nominated by the Republican Party at the Republican National Convention. The list of convention speakers and attendees included former presidential nominee Bob Dole, but the other prior nominees did not attend.

On September 26, 2016, Trump and Clinton faced off in their first presidential debate, which was held at Hofstra University in Hempstead, New York. The second presidential debate was held at Washington University in St. Louis, Missouri. The beginning of that debate was dominated by references to a recently leaked tape of Trump making sexually explicit comments, which Trump countered by referring to alleged sexual misconduct on the part of Bill Clinton. Prior to the debate, Trump had invited four women who had accused Bill Clinton of impropriety to a press conference. The final presidential debate was held on October 19 at the University of Nevada, Las Vegas. Trump's refusal to say whether he would accept the result of the election, regardless of the outcome, drew particular attention, with some saying it undermined democracy.

Political positions 

Trump's campaign platform emphasized renegotiating U.S.–China relations and free trade agreements such as NAFTA and the Trans-Pacific Partnership, strongly enforcing immigration laws, and building a new wall along the U.S.–Mexico border. His other campaign positions included pursuing energy independence while opposing climate change regulations such as the Clean Power Plan and the Paris Agreement, modernizing and expediting services for veterans, repealing and replacing the Affordable Care Act, abolishing Common Core education standards, investing in infrastructure, simplifying the tax code while reducing taxes for all economic classes, and imposing tariffs on imports by companies that offshore jobs. During the campaign, he also advocated a largely non-interventionist approach to foreign policy while increasing military spending, extreme vetting or banning immigrants from Muslim-majority countries to pre-empt domestic Islamic terrorism, and aggressive military action against the Islamic State of Iraq and the Levant. During the campaign Trump repeatedly called NATO "obsolete".

His political positions have been described as populist, and some of his views cross party lines. For example, his economic campaign plan calls for large reductions in income taxes and deregulation, consistent with Republican Party policies, along with significant infrastructure investment, usually considered a Democratic Party policy. According to political writer Jack Shafer, Trump may be a "fairly conventional American populist when it comes to his policy views", but he attracts free media attention, sometimes by making outrageous comments.

Trump has supported or leaned toward varying political positions over time. Politico has described his positions as "eclectic, improvisational and often contradictory", while NBC News counted "141 distinct shifts on 23 major issues" during his campaign.

Campaign rhetoric 

In his campaign, Trump said he disdained political correctness; he also said the media had intentionally misinterpreted his words, and he made other claims of adverse media bias. In part due to his fame, and due to his willingness to say things other candidates would not, and because a candidate who is gaining ground automatically provides a compelling news story, Trump received an unprecedented amount of free media coverage during his run for the presidency, which elevated his standing in the Republican primaries.

Fact-checking organizations have denounced Trump for making a record number of false statements compared to other candidates. At least four major publicationsPolitico, The Washington Post, The New York Times, and the Los Angeles Timeshave pointed out lies or falsehoods in his campaign statements, with the Los Angeles Times saying that "Never in modern presidential politics has a major candidate made false statements as routinely as Trump has". NPR said Trump's campaign statements were often opaque or suggestive.

Trump's penchant for hyperbole is believed to have roots in the New York real estate scene, where Trump established his wealth and where puffery abounds. Trump adopted his ghostwriter's phrase "truthful hyperbole" to describe his public speaking.

Support from the far right 

According to Michael Barkun, the Trump campaign was remarkable for bringing fringe ideas, beliefs, and organizations into the mainstream. During his presidential campaign, Trump was accused of pandering to white supremacists. He retweeted open racists, and repeatedly refused to condemn David Duke, the Ku Klux Klan or white supremacists, in an interview on CNN's State of the Union, saying he would first need to "do research" because he knew nothing about Duke or white supremacists. Duke himself enthusiastically supported Trump throughout the 2016 primary and election, and has said he and like-minded people voted for Trump because of his promises to "take our country back". Trump was later reported to have praised Adolf Hitler to his chief of staff John Kelly, opining that "Hitler did a lot of good things," and also reportedly kept a volume of Hitler's speeches on his bedside cabinet when he was younger, and was often compared to Hitler in the media during his 2016 campaign.

After repeated questioning by reporters, Trump said he disavowed David Duke and the KKK. Trump said on MSNBC's Morning Joe: "I disavowed him. I disavowed the KKK. Do you want me to do it again for the 12th time? I disavowed him in the past, I disavow him now."

The alt-right movement coalesced around Trump's candidacy, due in part to its opposition to multiculturalism and immigration.
Members of the alt-right enthusiastically supported Trump's campaign.
In August 2016, he appointed Steve Bannonthe executive chairman of Breitbart Newsas his campaign CEO; Bannon described Breitbart News as "the platform for the alt-right". In an interview days after the election, Trump condemned supporters who celebrated his victory with Nazi salutes.

Financial disclosures 

As a presidential candidate, Trump disclosed details of his companies, assets, and revenue sources to the extent required by the FEC. His 2015 report listed assets above $1.4 billion and outstanding debts of at least $265 million. The 2016 form showed little change.

Trump has not released his tax returns, contrary to the practice of every major candidate since 1976 and breaking his promise in 2014 to release them if he ran for office. He said his tax returns were being audited, and his lawyers had advised him against releasing them. Trump has told the press his tax rate was none of their business, and that he tries to pay "as little tax as possible".

In October 2016, portions of Trump's state filings for 1995 were leaked to a reporter from The New York Times. They show that Trump declared a loss of $916 million that year, which could have let him avoid taxes for up to 18 years. During the second presidential debate, Trump acknowledged using the deduction, but declined to provide details such as the specific years it was applied.

On March 14, 2017, the first two pages of Trump's 2005 federal income tax returns were leaked to MSNBC. The document states that Trump had a gross adjusted income of $150 million and paid $38 million in federal taxes. The White House confirmed the authenticity of the documents.

On April 3, 2019, the House Ways and Means Committee made a formal request to the Internal Revenue Service for Trump's personal and business tax returns from 2013 to 2018, setting a deadline of April 10. That day, Treasury secretary Steven Mnuchin said the deadline would not be met, and the deadline was extended to April 23, which also was not honored, and on May6 Mnuchin said the request would be denied. On May 10, 2019, committee chairman Richard Neal subpoenaed the Treasury Department and the IRS for the returns and seven days later the subpoenas were defied. A fall 2018 draft IRS legal memo asserted that Trump must provide his tax returns to Congress unless he invokes executive privilege, contradicting the administration's justification for defying the earlier subpoena. Mnuchin asserted the memo actually addressed a different matter.

Election to the presidency 

On November 8, 2016, Trump received 306 pledged electoral votes versus 232 for Clinton. The official counts were 304 and 227 respectively, after defections on both sides. Trump received nearly 2.9 million fewer popular votes than Clinton, which made him the fifth person to be elected president while losing the popular vote. Clinton was ahead nationwide with 65,853,514 votes to 62,984,828 votes.

Trump's victory was considered a stunning political upset by most observers, as polls had consistently showed Hillary Clinton with a nationwidethough diminishinglead, as well as a favorable advantage in most of the competitive states. Trump's support had been modestly underestimated throughout his campaign, and many observers blamed errors in polls, partially attributed to pollsters overestimating Clinton's support among well-educated and nonwhite voters, while underestimating Trump's support among white working-class voters.
The polls were relatively accurate, but media outlets and pundits alike showed overconfidence in a Clinton victory despite a large number of undecided voters and a favorable concentration of Trump's core constituencies in competitive states.

Trump won 30 states, including Michigan, Pennsylvania, and Wisconsin, which had been considered a blue wall of Democratic strongholds since the 1990s. Clinton won 20 states and the District of Columbia. Trump's victory marked the return of a Republican White House combined with control of both chambers of Congress.

Trump is the wealthiest president in U.S. history, even after adjusting for inflation, and at the time of his inauguration, the oldest person to take office as president. He is also the first president who did not serve in the military or hold elective or appointed government office prior to being elected. Of the 43 previous presidents, 38 had held prior elective office, two had not held elective office but had served in the Cabinet, and three had never held public office but had been commanding generals.

Presidency 

Expert scholarly analysis of Trump's presidency by presidential historians has generally ranked Trump's tenure as among history's worst; for example, the first major scholarly survey on presidential rankings after he left office ranked Trump 41st out of 44, ahead of only James Buchanan, Andrew Johnson, and Franklin Pierce.

Protests 

Some rallies during the primary season were accompanied by protests or violence, including attacks on Trump supporters and vice versa both inside and outside the venues. Trump's election victory sparked protests across the United States, in opposition to his policies and his inflammatory statements. Trump initially said on Twitter that these were "professional protesters, incited by the media", and were "unfair", but he later tweeted, "Love the fact that the small groups of protesters last night have passion for our great country."

In the weeks following Trump's inauguration, massive anti-Trump demonstrations took place, such as the Women Marches, which gathered 2,600,000 people worldwide, including 500,000 in Washington alone. Marches against his travel ban began across the country on January 29, 2017, just nine days after his inauguration.

2020 presidential campaign 

Trump signaled his intention to run for a second term by filing with the FEC within a few hours of assuming the presidency. This transformed his 2016 election committee into a 2020 reelection one. Trump marked the official start of the campaign with a rally in Melbourne, Florida, on February 18, 2017, less than a month after taking office. By January 2018, Trump's reelection committee had $22 million in hand, and it had raised a total amount exceeding $67 million by December 2018. $23 million was spent in the fourth quarter of 2018, as Trump supported various Republican candidates for the 2018 midterm elections.

2020 election defeat

On November 3, 2020, Trump lost re-election to Democratic nominee and former vice president Joe Biden. Trump received 232 electoral votes to Biden's 306. Trump received 74,216,154 in the popular vote to Biden's 81,268,924.

See also 
Business career of Donald Trump
Media career of Donald Trump

Notes

References

External links 

 President Trump's profile on WhiteHouse.gov
 Archive of Donald Trump's Tweets